Love at the Top is a 1974 satirical comedy-drama film directed by Michel Deville from a screenplay by Christopher Frank, based on the 1956 novel Le Mouton enragé by Roger Blondel.

Plot
Nicolas Mallet is a modest bank employee resigned to social mediocrity for the security that his job gives him. Introverted and dull, with the assistance and under the guidance of a former high school friend, novelist Claude Fabre, he will become a confident seducer, an opportunist upstart with no defined ambition. In the aftermath of the oil crisis, the Bel Ami of the 1970s experienced a remarkable social rise, relying exclusively on women whom he seduced almost unwittingly, while being remotely guided by Fabre. Going to seek power from those who rule him, knowing how to make himself indispensable, he will succeed in his ascent and favor that of his first conquest. It is only at the end of the film that we discover the real reasons behind Fabre's manipulative attitude.

Cast

References

External links
 
 Love at the Top at Variety Distribution
 

1974 films
1974 comedy-drama films
1970s French-language films
1970s satirical films
Films based on French novels
Films directed by Michel Deville
Films set in Paris
Films shot in Paris
French comedy-drama films
French satirical films
Italian comedy-drama films
Italian satirical films
1970s French films
1970s Italian films